Piet van Reenen born (17 January 1909 – 8 June 1969) was a Dutch former professional footballer who was a prolific goalscorer at Ajax. With 278 goals in 240 matches from 1929 to 1943, he is the club's all-time top goal scorer. He was also the club's top goal scorer for 9 consecutive seasons, from 1929–30 to 1937–38.

Career
Van Reenen began his football career at UVV Utrecht, where he made 30 goals in 37 games. His debut for UVV took place on October 3, 1926 when he was 17 years old in the second game of the season in the away game against FC Hilversum was incident in the second half for center forward Kan. The rest of the season he played all games. His first goals Van Reenen scored on 17 October 1926. In the away match won 2-0 against V.O.C.s He made two goals. His goal after 22 minutes was the first of an endless series. Only sixteen years later he made his 303rd enlaatste goal. 

Van Reenen is the first Dutch player who broke the 300 league goals border at the highest level. In his second season, Van Reenen was like many young players with a check. He was drafted but seven times and made just one goal. The first four games he was still in the base but then was only sporadically used him. In his third and final season with UVV Van Reenen jogged occasionally injured. UVV was almost the whole season down and eventually relegated. Despite the team turned bad and constantly changing compositions came Van Reenen still managed still in the field to 10 goals in 13 games. In his time at Van Reenen UVV came three appearances with one goal against Ajax. He apparently impressed enough to be allowed to play at Ajax in 1929 after the degradation of UVV. At Ajax he played on September 15, 1929 (debut against DFC) until October 18, 1942 (against Blauw-Wit Amsterdam). After Van Reenen had stopped all actually after the 1939-1940 season he later sometimes turn up as Ajax was in distress. Van Reenen eventually stopped at 33  with football.

International football
Despite his great talent, Van Reenen played only two matches for the Dutch national team scoring no goals.

Statistics

Honours
Eredivisie: 1930-31, 1932-33, 1933-34, 1936-37, 1938-39
KNVB Cup: 1942-43
Eredivisie top scorer: 1929-30,1930–31,1931–32,1932–33,1933–34,1934–35,1935–36,1936–37,1937–38

References

1909 births
1969 deaths
Netherlands international footballers
Association football forwards
Dutch footballers
AFC Ajax players
Footballers from Utrecht (city)